Łobaczewski (feminine: Łobaczewska) is a Polish-language surname. Its Russian-language version is Lobachevski.

Andrzej Łobaczewski, Polish psychiatrist
, Polish vocalist and composer 
, Polish musicologist 

Polish-language surnames